Come Organisation was a record label started by William Bennett in 1979 as a way to release albums by his own band, Come, when he was unable to find a label willing to release them.  It is best known for releasing the work of Bennett's subsequent band, Whitehouse.

The label's first release was the Come single "Come Sunday/Shaved Slits" in 1979.  When Bennett dissolved Come in 1980 to form Whitehouse, Come Organisation continued to release his work, serving as the label for all of Whitehouse's albums from its inception through 1985's Great White Death.  In addition, Bennett began to release albums by other controversial or extreme groups, including Sutcliffe Jugend, Maurizio Bianchi, Nurse With Wound and even Charles Manson.

When Whitehouse went on hiatus at the end of 1985, Come Organisation was dissolved.  Bennett again created a label for his releases in 1988, but called it Susan Lawly rather than reviving Come Organisation.

Catalog

Charles Manson
Come
Dennis Andrew Nilsen
Ed Kemper
Leibstandarte SS MB
Leni Riefenstahl
Nurse With Wound
Recitifier
Sutcliffe Jugend
Ted Bundy
The New Order
Whitehouse

See also
 List of record labels

References

External links
Come Organisation discography (Archived)

British record labels
Record labels established in 1979
Record labels disestablished in 1985
Noise music record labels